

Gum Tree Gully Conservation Park is a protected area in the Australian state of South Australia located in the locality of  Hindmarsh Tiers   about  south  of the state capital of Adelaide and about   south-east of  Myponga.

The conservation park consists of the following land in the cadastral unit of the Hundred of Encounter Bay – Allotment 31 of Deposited Plan 79974. The name was approved by the Surveyor General of South Australia on 18 August 2009 and is derived from a gully called Gum Tree Gully whose extent includes the conservation park.

Gum Tree Gully Conservation Park is reported as being one of the “new reserves” created as a “direct initiative” of the recovery plan for the Mount Lofty Ranges southern emu-wren (Stipiturus malachurus intermedius) which is a bird species listed as endangered under the Environment Protection and Biodiversity Conservation Act 1999.

The conservation park is categorised as an IUCN Category III protected area

See also
Protected areas of South Australia

References

External links
Webpage for the Gum Tree Gully Conservation Park on the Protected Planet website

Conservation parks of South Australia
Protected areas established in 2010
2010 establishments in Australia